The DM-11 is a German anti-tank mine popular in countries of Africa, not suited to be disarmed or neutralized.

References

 

Anti-tank mines
Land mines of Germany